The 2008 AFC Cup was the fifth edition of the AFC Cup, playing between clubs from nations who are members of the Asian Football Confederation.

Qualified teams

20 clubs will be competing, including champions of the national leagues and champions of the primary knock-out competition from the following countries which are AFC-affiliated countries which fall into the AFC's 'developing nations' category.
In that season, the club of Bangladesh, Turkmenistan, Indonesia not participated.

Group stage

The draw was held on 17 October 2007 in Kuala Lumpur, Malaysia.

Key to colors in group tables:
Green: Group winners and Best runners-up advance to the quarter finals.

Group A

Group B

Group C

Group D

Group E

Best runners-up

Three best three runners-up qualify for the quarter-finals.

Knockout stage

Bracket

Quarter-finals 
The first leg matches will be played on 16 September, and the second leg matches will be played on 23 September 2008.

|}

First leg

Second leg

Semi-finals 
The first leg matches will be played on 7 October, and the second leg matches will be played on 21 October 2008.

|}

First leg

Second leg

Final 
The first and second legs of the final are scheduled to be played on 31 October and 7 November 2008, respectively.

First leg

Second leg

Awards

Player of the Tournament
 Mahmood Abdulrahman
 Al-Muharraq

Top scorer
 Rico – 19 goals
 Al-Muharraq

Statistics

Top goalscorers

External links
2008 AFC Cup at the-afc.com
AFC Calendar of Competitions 2008

 
2008
2